Bold Journey is a travelogue program broadcast by ABC television in the United States during the late 1950s.

Bold Journey consisted of films taken by explorers and adventurers during their travels to remote parts of the world.  The films were usually set up by an interview between a program host and the guest, who then narrated his film with the aid of helpful questions from the host.  The program was first telecast on July 16, 1956 and ended with the August 31, 1959 show.  The initial host was John Stephenson; Jack Douglas became host effective with the October 28, 1957 broadcast.

Initially shown on Monday nights, Bold Journey was moved to Thursday nights in February 1957, but was returned to Mondays, in a later time slot, in June of that year.  Beginning that fall, Bold Journey would be very little-seen, as it was scheduled against Tales of Wells Fargo on NBC and Arthur Godfrey's Talent Scouts on CBS; both were popular programs.  The next fall, while Bold Journey remained opposite Wells Fargo on NBC, its new competition from CBS in its time slot was the even more popular Father Knows Best.  Bold Journey became one of the lowest-rated prime time programs of its era, but managed to remain on the air as long as it did due to its very low production costs relative to scripted programs, which was an important factor to ABC, which in that era had a considerably smaller budget than the other two U.S. commercial television networks.  However, in the fall of 1959, ABC decided to forgo this approach and attempt to compete directly for viewers with the other networks in this time slot, and Bold Journey was replaced by one of the most expensively produced series of the era, Warner Bros.' Cheyenne.

References
Brooks, Tim and Marsh, Earle, The Complete Directory to Prime Time Network and Cable TV Shows

External links
 

American Broadcasting Company original programming
1956 American television series debuts
1959 American television series endings
American travel television series
Black-and-white American television shows